Haringhata Mahavidyalaya, established in 1986, is a general degree college in Nadia district. It offers undergraduate courses in arts, commerce and sciences. It is affiliated to  University of Kalyani.

Location

Departments

Science

Chemistry
Physics
Mathematics
Computer Science

Arts and Commerce

Bengali

English
History
Geography
Political Science
Education
Economics
Sociology
Sanskrit
Philosophy
Physical Education
Commerce

Accreditation
The college is recognized by the University Grants Commission (UGC). In 2006 it was accredited by the National Assessment and Accreditation Council (NAAC), and awarded B grade, an accreditation that has since then expired.

See also

References

External links
Haringhata Mahavidyalaya
University of Kalyani
University Grants Commission
National Assessment and Accreditation Council

Colleges affiliated to University of Kalyani
Educational institutions established in 1986
Universities and colleges in Nadia district
1986 establishments in West Bengal